Big Strides is a London-based 3-piece band that plays an original mix of blues, rock, jazz and funk. With an original lineup consisting of Marcus O'Neill (vocals, guitar, harmonica), Lewis Kirk (drums) and Tom Pi (double bass), Chris Kelly replaced Tom Pi as double bassist in 2006. 

Their first album Small Town, Big Strides was released in 2005 on their own label, Tall Order Records. The first single "Suicidal" notched up 300,000 downloads in the US and prompted Jonathan Ross on BBC Radio 2 to comment "I can't decide if I love it or if it upsets me".

After regular appearances at Ronnie Scott's, tours of the UK and performances at Glastonbury, They signed to management  Brett_Leboff at Monumental Management Ltd from 2006 to 2011 and first went to Japan in 2006 to play at Summer Sonic, following a sudden rush of import album sales. Their second album "Cry It All Out" was picked up for release in Japan (EMI) and Germany (India Media/ Rough Trade).

The breadth and variety of Big Strides' influences has seen them support a wide range of artists including Roy Ayers, Horace Andy, Damien Rice, Bloc Party and Arctic Monkeys.

Discography

Albums

Singles

References

Musical groups established in 2003
English rock music groups
Musical groups from London